Live Premonition  is the first live DVD by Greek heavy metal band Firewind.
It had 22 songs and is released on 2 CDs or 1 DVD. There is also a combo pack available.
Songs 3-10 are from the Firewind album The Premonition. All the other tracks with exception of the solos are from prior Firewind albums. 
The show was filmed on 12 January 2008 and subsequently released on 28 November 2008.

Track listing 
 Allegiance
 Insanity
 Into the Fire
 Head up High
 Mercenary Man
 Angels Forgive Me
 My Loneliness
 Circle of Life
 The Silent Code
 Life Foreclosed
 Destination Forever
 Keyboard solo
 Guitar solo
 The Fire and the Fury
 Drum solo/Dreamchaser
 Till the End of Time
 Deliverance
 Brother's Keeper
 Between Heaven and Hell
 I am the Anger
 Falling to Pieces
 Tyranny

Extras
Documentary / Tales of the Greek Road Warriors
Unplugged - MAD TV Sessions
My Loneliness
Where Do We Go from Here?
Live in Montreal 2008
Head up High
The Fire and the Fury
Till the End of Time
Promotional Videos
Mercenary Man
Head up High
Falling to Pieces
Breaking the Silence

Audio CD
Live Premonition was also released as a stand-alone double audio CD - disc one containing the first ten songs of the DVD, while disc two held the remaining twelve.

Unreleased song 
The song "Perasmenes mou Agapes" was played at the filming of the DVD, but had to be cut for copyright reasons. Fan filmed footage of this song has surfaced, though. One of the on-stage cameramen can be seen on this recording, proving it to be from the night of the taping.

2008 live albums
2008 video albums
Firewind albums
Live video albums